Hardingham is a civil parish in the English county of Norfolk.
It covers an area of 4 square miles (9.78 km) with a population of 274 in 110 households at the 2001 census, decreasing to a population of 267 in 107 households at the 2011 Census.   For the purposes of local government, it falls within the district of Breckland. The parish includes the hamlet of Danemoor Green about one mile north-east of the main village.
An interesting fact about Hardingham is that a philanthropist opened a school nearby which gave local children a higher standard of education than was usual in a rural farming area. (date?)
The village is most notable for Hardingham railway station, a stop on the Mid-Norfolk Railway. It is a few miles away from the town of Wymondham, and roughly fifteen miles from Norwich.

The villages name means 'Homestead/village of Hearda's people'.

Watermill 
The Eastern Daily Press, on 7 June 2012, reported that the watermill on the River Yare in Hardingham was deliberately set on fire in 1967 for the film The Shuttered Room. The mill is shown on the village sign.

Notes 

http://kepn.nottingham.ac.uk/map/place/Norfolk/Hardingham

Breckland District
Villages in Norfolk
Civil parishes in Norfolk